The competition this year there are 3 teams taking part with the Czech Republic being joined by Norway and Ukraine. The winners were Ukraine.

Tournament

See also

References

External links

European rugby league competitions
2013 in rugby league